The Latin Cup is an international roller hockey tournament held by the youth (under-23) national teams of France, Italy, Portugal and Spain. 

Created in 1956, the tournament was held every year and hosted alternately in one of these countries. The first editions were played by senior players. Between 1964 and 1986, the competition did not take place. In 1987, it was restored, but opened only to young players (under-23). In 2001, Spain could not attend the Latin Cup and was replaced by Germany.

The current champions are Spain, who won a record 12th title at the 2018 edition.

Results

By edition

By country

References

External links
CERH Official Website

Recurring sporting events established in 1956
Roller hockey competitions